The High German dialects, or simply High German; not to be confused with Standard High German which is commonly also called High German, comprise the varieties of German spoken south of the Benrath and Uerdingen isoglosses in central and southern Germany, Austria, Liechtenstein, Switzerland, Luxembourg, and eastern Belgium, as well as in neighbouring portions of France (Alsace and northern Lorraine), Italy (South Tyrol), the Czech Republic (Bohemia), and Poland (Upper Silesia). They are also spoken in diaspora in Romania, Russia, Canada, the United States, Brazil, Argentina, Mexico, Chile, and Namibia.

High German is marked by the High German consonant shift, separating it from Low German (Low Saxon) and Low Franconian (including Dutch) within the continental West Germanic dialect continuum.

Classification

As a technical term, the "high" in High German is a geographical reference to the group of dialects that forms "High German" (i.e. "Highland" German), out of which developed Standard German, Yiddish and Luxembourgish. It refers to the Central Uplands (Mittelgebirge) and Alpine areas of central and southern Germany; it also includes Luxembourg, Austria, Liechtenstein, and most of Switzerland. This is opposed to Low German, which is spoken in the lowlands and along the flat sea coasts of the North German Plain.

High German in this broader sense can be subdivided into Upper German (Oberdeutsch), Central German (Mitteldeutsch, this includes Luxembourgish, which itself is now a standard language), and High Franconian German, which is a transitional dialect between the two.

High German is distinguished from other West Germanic varieties in that it took part in the High German consonant shift (c. AD 500). To see this, compare the following:

In the southernmost High Alemannic dialects, there is a further shift; Sack (like English/Low German "sack/Sack") is pronounced  ( to ).

History

Old High German evolved from about 500 AD. Around 1200 the Swabian and East Franconian varieties of Middle High German became dominant as a court and poetry language (Minnesang) under the rule of the House of Hohenstaufen.

The term "High German" as spoken in central and southern Germany (Upper Saxony, Franconia, Swabia, Bavaria) and Austria was first documented in the 15th century. Gradually driving back Low German variants since the Early modern period, the Early New High German varieties, especially the East Central German of the Luther Bible, formed an important basis for the development of Standard German.

Family
Divisions between subfamilies within Germanic are rarely precisely defined, because most form continuous clines, with adjacent dialects being mutually intelligible and more separated ones not. In particular, there has never been an original "Proto-High German". For this and other reasons, the idea of representing the relationships between West Germanic language forms in a tree diagram at all is controversial among linguists. What follows should be used with care in the light of this caveat.
 Central German
 East Central German
 Thuringian
 Upper Saxon, including Erzgebirgisch
 South Marchian
 Lusatian
 Silesian (now mostly spoken by the German minority in Upper Silesia)
 High Prussian (nearly extinct)
 West Central German
 Central Franconian
 Ripuarian
 Moselle Franconian dialects, including Luxembourgish
 Hunsrik language (from the Hunsrückisch dialect)
 Rhine Franconian
 Palatine, including Lorraine Franconian (France)
 Pennsylvania Dutch (in the United States and Canada)
 Hessian
 High Franconian, in the transitional area between Central and Upper German
 East Franconian
 South Franconian
 Upper German
 Alemannic in the broad sense or West Upper German (German: Westoberdeutsch), including Swiss German dialects
 Swabian
 Alemannic in the strict sense
 Low Alemannic, including Alsatian and Basel German
 High Alemannic
 Highest Alemannic
 Bavarian or East Upper German (German: Ostoberdeutsch), including Austrian German dialects
 Northern Bavarian 
 Central Bavarian, including Viennese
 Southern Bavarian, including Mócheno in Trentino, Italy
 Gottscheerish
 Cimbrian, nearly extinct 
 Hutterite German (in Canada and the United States)
 Lombardic, extinct
 Yiddish, evolved from Middle High German

See also

 High Germany

References

Further reading
 Friedrich Maurer (1942), Nordgermanen und Alemannen:  Studien zur germanischen und frühdeutschen Sprachgeschichte, Stammes- und Volkskunde, Strasbourg:  Hünenburg, [designation of High German languages as Irminonic].

 
German dialects
West Germanic languages